Sulcacis lengi is a species of minute tree-fungus beetle in the family Ciidae. It is found in North America.

References

Further reading

 

Ciidae
Articles created by Qbugbot
Beetles described in 1917